Mathilde Tybring-Gjedde  (born 15 December 1992) is a Norwegian politician.

She was elected deputy representative to the Storting for the period 2017–2021 for the Conservative Party. She replaced Ine Marie Eriksen Søreide at the Storting from October 2017. She was elected ordinary representative to the Storting from the constituency of Oslo in 2021.

References

1992 births
Living people
Politicians from Oslo
Conservative Party (Norway) politicians
Members of the Storting